An alfet ("fire vat") was an ancient cauldron filled with boiling water, into which an accused person was to plunge his arm up to his elbow. Its use was a form of trial by ordeal. The arm and hand were then bound and left for three days. If the wound was found to have begun to heal cleanly the person was judged to be innocent. However, if the scald was infected or unhealed, the victim was held to be guilty. It was also used for purgation.

References 

Charles Dufresne, Sieur Du Cange, Glossarium mediæ et infimæ Latinitatis. 1840–50; 1883–87.

Containers
Medieval instruments of torture
European instruments of torture
Trial by ordeal
Cauldrons